The 1988–89 Alabama Crimson Tide men's basketball team represented the University of Alabama in the 1988-89 NCAA Division I men's basketball season. The team's head coach was Wimp Sanderson, who was in his ninth season at Alabama. The team played their home games at Coleman Coliseum in Tuscaloosa, Alabama. They finished the season with a record of 23–8, 12–6 in conference, good for second behind Florida.

It was a strong off-season of signings for the Crimson Tide.  Freshmen signees Marcus Webb and Robert Horry and junior college transfer David Benoit joined holdovers Keith Askins, Melvin Cheatum, Alvin Lee, and Michael Ansley.

The Tide won the 1989 SEC men's basketball tournament, beating Florida in the final and earning an automatic bid to the NCAA tournament.  However, they were upset in the first round by South Alabama in the first ever meeting in history between the two Alabama-based schools.

Roster

References 

Alabama Crimson Tide men's basketball seasons
Alabama
Alabama
1988 in sports in Alabama
1989 in sports in Alabama